Shim Jae-Hong (born August 28, 1968) is a male South Korean former handball player who competed in the 1988 Summer Olympics and in the 1992 Summer Olympics.

In 1988 he was a member of the South Korean team which won the silver medal in the Olympic tournament. He played five matches and scored four goals.

Four years later he finished sixth with the South Korean team in the 1992 Olympic tournament. He played five matches again and scored six goals.

External links
profile

1968 births
Living people
South Korean male handball players
Olympic handball players of South Korea
Handball players at the 1988 Summer Olympics
Handball players at the 1992 Summer Olympics
Olympic silver medalists for South Korea
Olympic medalists in handball
Asian Games medalists in handball
Handball players at the 1990 Asian Games
Medalists at the 1988 Summer Olympics
Asian Games gold medalists for South Korea
Medalists at the 1990 Asian Games
20th-century South Korean people